The Dead Mountain Echo was a weekly newspaper published Tuesdays in Oakridge in the U.S. state of Oregon since 1973. Larry Roberts joined the Echo in 1973, and became its owner.  As of November, 2017 the owner is Viki Burns Publishing, LLC; Burns started with the Echo on or before 2015. She relinquished ownership back to Larry and Debra Roberts October, 2020. Efforts to sell the newspaper were unsuccessful and it subsequently closed.

Echo negatives are published periodically on its Facebook page ‘Echo Archives.’

Its circulation was reported as 465.

The Echo was a general member of the Oregon Newspaper Publishers Association.

When it launched in the 1970s, the Echo drove a 70-year competitor out of business. In 1975, the Echo won the "general excellence" award for small weeklies from the ONPA. Award-winning journalist Alan Robertson got his start in the newspaper business at the Echo in 1978.

In 1980, the paper took second place in the "Special Issue" category in the ONPA awards.

Tom Henderson, a humor/opinion columnist in northern Idaho, made several references to the Echo in his column in the 2000s.

The Echo's coverage has been mentioned or picked up by various neighboring news organizations.

References 

Newspapers published in Oregon
Lane County, Oregon
1973 establishments in Oregon
Publications established in 1973